= Varberg, Gävleborg =

Varberg
- Location within Sweden Gävleborg Location within Sweden
- Coordinates: 61°21′N 17°04′E
- Country: Sweden
- County: Gävleborg County
- Province: Gävleborg
- Time zone: UTC+1 (CET)
  - Summer (DST): UTC+2 (CEST)

Varberg is a village in Gävleborg, Sweden.
